Siili (Estonian for "Hedgehog") is a subdistrict in the district of Mustamäe, Tallinn, the capital of Estonia. It has a population of 3,649.

Gallery

References

Subdistricts of Tallinn